Sweden competed at the 1908 Summer Olympics in London, United Kingdom.  It was the third appearance of the European nation, which had missed only the 1904 Summer Olympics.

Medalists

Athletics

Sweden was one of 5 nations to win at least one gold medal in athletics, and one of only three to earn more than one.  Sweden's two gold medals placed the nation third in the standings behind the United States and Great Britain.

Running

Jumping

Throwing

Cycling

Diving

Sweden dominated the platform diving in 1908, taking the top four spots in the event. In addition to the men's competitions, Ebba Gisico participated in a women's diving exhibition along with Valborg Florström of Finland.

Fencing

Figure skating

The Swedish men swept the medals, while the only female Swedish skater took 4th.

Football

Summary

Gymnastics

Sailing

Shooting

Swimming

Tennis

Sweden was Great Britain's only competitor in the indoor tennis events, taking two bronze medals.

Tug of war

Sweden's tug of war team lost in the semifinals (their first match).  They did not appear for the bronze medal match, thereby taking 4th place.

Water polo

Summary

Wrestling

Sources
 
 
 

Nations at the 1908 Summer Olympics
1908
Olympics